Puri Yáñez (born 1936, Cartagena, Spain) is a Spanish-born artist known for her surrealist oil paintings.

Born in 1936 in Cartagena, Spain, and at the age of three she moved with her family to Mexico due to the fall of the Spanish Republic in 1939. She attended the Women's University of Mexico (Universidad Femenina de México) from 1952 to 1955 and at Faculty of Arts and Design (previously named Escuela Nacional de Artes Plásticas) from 1956 to 1958.

References 

1936 births
Living people
20th-century Mexican painters
20th-century Spanish painters
20th-century Spanish women artists
21st-century Spanish women artists
Mexican surrealist artists
Spanish surrealist artists
Spanish emigrants to Mexico
Mexican women painters
Spanish women painters
Women surrealist artists
People from Cartagena, Spain